Jiří Kormaník (26 March 1935 – 3 November 2017) was an amateur wrestler. He competed for Czechoslovakia at the 1960, 1964 and 1968 Olympics in Greco-Roman wrestling and won a silver medal in 1964.

References

1935 births
2017 deaths
People from Caraș-Severin County
Czechoslovak male sport wrestlers
Olympic wrestlers of Czechoslovakia
Wrestlers at the 1960 Summer Olympics
Wrestlers at the 1964 Summer Olympics
Wrestlers at the 1968 Summer Olympics
Czech male sport wrestlers
Olympic silver medalists for Czechoslovakia
Olympic medalists in wrestling
World Wrestling Championships medalists
Medalists at the 1964 Summer Olympics
European Wrestling Championships medalists